For the software testing tools, see xUnit.

The x unit (symbol xu) is a unit of length approximately equal to 0.1 pm (10−13 m). It is used to quote the wavelength of X-rays and gamma rays.

Originally defined by the Swedish physicist Manne Siegbahn (1886–1978) in 1925, the x unit could not at that time be measured directly; the definition was instead made in terms of the spacing between planes of the calcite crystals used in the measuring apparatus.

In modern usage, there are two separate x units, which are defined in terms of the wavelengths of the two most commonly used X-ray lines in X-ray crystallography:
 the copper x unit (symbol xu(Cu Kα1)) is defined so that the wavelength of the Kα1 line of copper is exactly 1537.400 xu(Cu Kα1);
 the molybdenum x unit (symbol xu(Mo Kα1)) is defined so that the wavelength of the Kα1 line of molybdenum is exactly 707.831 xu(Mo Kα1).

The 2006 CODATA recommended values for these units are:
1 xu(Cu Kα1) = ,
1 xu(Mo Kα1) = .

See also 
 Ångström
 Ångström star

References 

Units of length
Customary units of measurement
X-rays